Beta-synuclein is a protein that in humans is encoded by the SNCB gene.

The protein encoded by this gene is highly homologous to alpha-synuclein. These proteins are abundantly expressed in the brain and putatively inhibit phospholipase D2 selectively. The encoded protein, which may play a role in neuronal plasticity, is abundant in neurofibrillary lesions of patients with Alzheimer's disease. This protein has been shown to be highly expressed in the substantia nigra of the brain, a region of neuronal degeneration in patients with Parkinson's disease; however, no direct relation to Parkinson's disease has been established. Two transcript variants encoding the same protein have been found for this gene.

Beta-synuclein is a synuclein protein found primarily in brain tissue and is seen mainly in presynaptic terminals.  Beta-synuclein is predominantly expressed in the neocortex, hippocampus, striatum, thalamus, and cerebellum.  It is not found in Lewy bodies, but it is associated with hippocampal pathology in PD and DLB.

Beta-synuclein is suggested to be an inhibitor of alpha-synuclein aggregation, which occurs in neurodegenerative diseases such as Parkinson's disease. Thus, beta-synuclein may protect the central nervous system from the neurotoxic effects of alpha-synuclein and provide a novel treatment of neurodegenerative disorders.

See also
Synuclein

References

Further reading

External links